Barbara Broadcast is an American adult erotic film released in 1977. The film was directed by Radley Metzger (as "Henry Paris") and filmed in several elaborate locations in New York City, including the Olympia ballroom and restaurant in the Royal Manhattan Hotel.

Plot
Barbara Broadcast, a world-famous liberated woman and best-selling author, is interviewed by a journalist about her successful career in an elegant Manhattan hotel restaurant, where gourmet food and erotic activities are on the menu: a surrealistic "Buñuelian" atmosphere, according to one film reviewer. Afterwards, other Manhattan moments in New York City are featured, including a corporate office encounter and a casual meeting in a busy night club.

Cast

 Annette Haven as Barbara Broadcast
 Bobby Astyr as the Maitre d'
 C. J. Laing as Roberta, the interviewer
 Constance Money as a Slave
 Jamie Gillis as Curley
 Michael Gaunt as a Client
 Sharon Mitchell as a Waitress
 Susan McBain as a Diner
 Wade Nichols as a Cook
 Zebedy Colt as a Diner

Reception
According to an X-Critic film reviewer, Barbara Broadcast is "... a playful, funny and beautifully made film for grownups, a celebration of carnality and earthly delights shot with an artist’s eye for composition and set to an excellent [music] score ...". Barbara Broadcast, according to another reviewer, "... is a fun, witty, and charming film ...". Another reviewer notes, " ... [the film has] plenty of electric atmosphere and [music] ... This is porno chic! ..." Paracinema film critic Heather Drain writes, "Metzger’s work is known for its eye candy and this film is no exception, with every frame looking like a perfectly composed piece of art ... Barbara Broadcast may not be heavy on plot, but is an exquisitely crafted film from one of the best American directors to have emerged [since the 1970s] ... Radley Metzger is truly one of a kind."

History
Barbara Broadcast was released  during the Golden Age of Porn (inaugurated by the 1969 release of Andy Warhol Blue Movie) in the United States, at a time of "porno chic", in which adult erotic films were just beginning to be widely released, publicly discussed by celebrities (like Johnny Carson and Bob Hope) and taken seriously by film critics (like Roger Ebert).

Notes
According to one film reviewer, Radley Metzger's films, including those made during the Golden Age of Porn (1969–1984), are noted for their "lavish design, witty screenplays, and a penchant for the unusual camera angle". Another reviewer noted that his films were "highly artistic — and often cerebral ... and often featured gorgeous cinematography". Film and audio works by Metzger have been added to the permanent collection of the Museum of Modern Art (MoMA) in New York City.

Restoration
On July 4, 2013, DistribPix released a restoration of the film, with the cooperation of the director. The result had a limited exhibition in theaters, but the main outcome of the project was the first official DVD and Blu-ray versions. A listing of the music on the film soundtrack was released earlier.

Awards
 Winner 1989 – Member of XRCO Hall of Fame.
 Nominee 2014 – AVN Award (Best DVD Extras).
 Winner 2015 – X-Rated: Greatest Adult Movies of All Time.

Music soundtrack

See also

 Andy Warhol filmography
 Erotic art
 Erotic films in the United States
 Erotic photography
 Golden Age of Porn
 List of American films of 1977
 Sex in film
 Unsimulated sex

References

Further reading
 
 Heffernan, Kevin, "A social poetics of pornography", Quarterly Review of Film and Video, Volume 15, Issue 3, December 1994, pp. 77–83. .
 Lehman, Peter, Pornography: film and culture, Rutgers depth of field series, Rutgers University Press, 2006, .
 Williams, Linda, Hard core: power, pleasure, and the "frenzy of the visible", University of California Press, 1999, .

External links
 Barbara Broadcast at  MUBI (related to The Criterion Collection)
 .
 
 Barbara Broadcast on the Amazon WebSite.
 Barbara Broadcast − behind the scenes
 Barbara Broadcast − 2013 restoration at DistribPix.

 Barbara Broadcast (Trailer-1; 04:09); (Trailer-2; 10:04).

American erotic films
Films directed by Radley Metzger
1977 films
1970s pornographic films
Films set in Manhattan
1970s English-language films
1970s American films